General elections were held in South Africa on 8 February 1921 to elect the 134 members of the House of Assembly. The South African Party, which since the previous election had fused with the Unionist Party, won an absolute majority.

Delimitation of electoral divisions
The South Africa Act 1909 had provided for a delimitation commission to define the boundaries for each electoral division. The representation by province, under the third delimitation report of 1919, is set out in the table below. The figures in brackets are the number of electoral divisions in the previous (1913) delimitation. If there is no figure in brackets then the number was unchanged.

The electoral divisions used for this general election were the same as those for the 1920 election.

Results

Notes

References
 South Africa 1982: Official Yearbook of the Republic of South Africa, published by Chris van Rensburg Publications

General elections in South Africa
South Africa
General
February 1921 events